Florent Boudié (born 22 September 1973) is a French politician of La République En Marche! (LREM) who has been a member of the French National Assembly since 2012, representing the department of Gironde.

Early life and education
Boudié was born to a father who was a member of the French Resistance. He went to college at the Institut d'études politiques de Bordeaux from 1990 to 1994.

Political career
Boudié was originally elected in 2012, then as a member of the Socialist Party. He was re-elected on 18 June 2017, this time representing LREM.

In parliament, Boudié serves on the Committee on Legal Affairs. In this capacity, he was the parliament's rapporteur on a 2018 Asylum and Immigration Law and 2021 legislation on regulating Islam in France.

In addition to his committee assignments, Boudié is a member of the French-Senegalese Parliamentary Friendship Group. He also represents the parliament on the Legislation and Financial Regulation Advisory Committee (CCLRF) at the Bank of France.

In early 2018, Boudié set up an informal parliamentary working group on Islam in order to contribute to the government's bill aimed at better organising and supervising the financing of the Muslim faith in France.

In July 2019, Boudié stood as a candidate for the position as chair of the LREM parliamentary group; in the vote, he came in second after Gilles Le Gendre who was re-elected in the first round. Since 2020, he has been part of the group's leadership under chair Christophe Castaner.

Political positions
In May 2018, Boudié co-sponsored an initiative in favour of a bioethics law extending to homosexual and single women free access to fertility treatments such as in vitro fertilisation (IVF) under France's national health insurance; it was one of the campaign promises of President Emmanuel Macron and marked the first major social reform of his five-year term.

In July 2019, Boudié voted in favor of the French ratification of the European Union’s Comprehensive Economic and Trade Agreement (CETA) with Canada.

References

1973 births
Living people
Deputies of the 14th National Assembly of the French Fifth Republic
Deputies of the 15th National Assembly of the French Fifth Republic
La République En Marche! politicians
Socialist Party (France) politicians
Politicians from Nouvelle-Aquitaine
People from Gironde
Deputies of the 16th National Assembly of the French Fifth Republic